Selma Union Depot, also known as Selma Union Station, is a train station and museum in Selma, North Carolina. Built in 1924, it is currently served by two Amtrak passenger trains, the Palmetto and the Carolinian. It is located at 500 East Railroad Street in the heart of downtown Selma.  The Silver Meteor and the Silver Star have their northern split here, but do not stop in Selma.

The station appears in Amtrak timetables as Selma-Smithfield.

History

The original station in the area was the Mitchner station, built in 1855 a few blocks from the current station.  The building still exists and is believed to be the oldest surviving train station in North Carolina.

A wood-frame structure at the current site was constructed in 1897.  The current station was built as its replacement in 1924 by architect A.M. Griffin, for the Atlantic Coast Line and Southern Railroads. The ACL trains were north-south for the company's Everglades and Palmetto. The Southern Railway trains were east-west trains on the North Carolina section of the Carolina Special.

The station was closed in 1971, when Amtrak took over passenger service throughout much of the country. In 1975, the people of the city thwarted the station's demolition, and beginning the year after this reopened the station as a museum devoted to the city's railroad heritage. It was added to the National Register of Historic Places on June 24, 1982. Amtrak service to Selma began on October 31, 1982, when the Palmetto began stopping there.

Layout
The old freight house is located to the west of the station on Railroad Street and South Webb Avenue. A maintenance shed is located to the north. Two tracks exist along the east side of the station, another one exists along the south side, and the fourth is a section of curved track behind the station that connects two of the tracks. Three platforms exist at the station, one of which is along the curved track. A parking space exclusively for the handicapped can be found between the curve and the station house.

Routes 
 Carolinian
 Palmetto

References

External links 

Selma Station – NC By Train
Selma-Smithfield Amtrak Station (USA Rail Guide – Train Web)
History & Heritage - Selma Historic Union Station (Visit Selma.org)

Railway stations on the National Register of Historic Places in North Carolina
Buildings and structures in Johnston County, North Carolina
Amtrak stations in North Carolina
Former Atlantic Coast Line Railroad stations
Former Southern Railway (U.S.) stations
Union stations in the United States
Transportation in Johnston County, North Carolina
Railway stations in the United States opened in 1924
National Register of Historic Places in Johnston County, North Carolina